Tai Chi (太極) is a Hong Kong rock band formed in Hong Kong in 1985 by Patrick Lui (lead vocalist), Albert Lui (lead vocalist), Joey Tang (guitarist), Gary Tong (keyboardist), Ernest Lau (guitarist), Eddy Sing (bass guitarist and backing vocal), and Ricky Chu (drummer). They are joined by the 1980s "Band-booming Era" along with Fundamental, Beyond, Tat Ming Pair, Blue Jeans, Small Island, Raidas, Citybeat.  Tai Chi is well known for their catchy and modern tunes. They are still active to date and have a large base of fans.

Members
 Patrick Lui (lead and backing vocals)
 Joey Tang (guitar, backing and lead vocals)
 Ernest Lau (guitar, backing vocals)
 Eddy Sing (bass guitar, backing vocals)
 Ricky Chu (drums, percussion)

Past members
 Albert Lui (lead and backing vocals, left the band and migrated to Canada in 1993)
 Gary Tong (keyboards, piano, backing vocals, deceased in 2021 due to heart attack)

Hit Songs 
 暴風紅唇 (Stormy red lips)
 他 (Him)
 紅色跑車 (Red Sport Car)
 Dance all nite
 吶喊 (Shout)
 迷途 (Stray)
 緣 (Fate)
 Celia
 禁區 (Restricted area)
 欠 (Without)
 留住我吧 (Let me stay)
 全人類高歌 (Human race sing together)
 Crystal
 每一句說話 (Every word)
 頂天立地 (Upright)
 2030
 樂與悲 (Happy and sad)

Hong Kong musical groups
Chinese rock music groups